KJLT may refer to:

 KJLT (AM), a radio station (970 AM) licensed to North Platte, Nebraska, United States
 KJLT-FM, a radio station (94.9 FM) licensed to North Platte, Nebraska